Triagem Station is a subway station on the Rio de Janeiro Metro that services the neighbourhood of Rocha in the North Zone of Rio de Janeiro.

References

Metrô Rio stations
Railway stations opened in 1988
1988 establishments in Brazil